Audlem is a village and civil parish located in the unitary authority of Cheshire East and the ceremonial county of Cheshire in North West England, approximately  south of Nantwich. Close to the border with the neighbouring county of Shropshire, the village is eight miles (13 km) east of Whitchurch and seven miles (11 km) north of Market Drayton. According to the 2001 census, the population of the entire civil parish was 1,790, increasing to 1,991 at the 2011 Census.

History
Audlem was mentioned in the Domesday Book as Aldelime, and Edward I granted it a market charter in 1295.

Geography
Audlem is on the Shropshire Union Canal, which has a flight of 15 locks, designed by Thomas Telford, to raise the canal  from the Cheshire Plain to the Shropshire Plain. The River Weaver passes west of the village. Audlem railway station closed along with the local railway line in the 1960s.

Landmarks
Moss Hall is an Elizabethan timber-framed hall from 1616  from Audlem village centre.

Education and facilities
Audlem has clubs for tennis, badminton, football, cricket, golf, pigeon racing (or pigeon-fancying), caravanning, bell ringing and bowls. Cyclists meet informally at the Old Priest-House Cafe.
Audlem has a website, AudlemOnline.
Saint James' Primary School is the only school in the village.

Notable residents and associated people
 Isabella Whitney (c.1546/48–after 1624), the first woman known to have published secular poetry in the English language, grew up in Ryle Green when her father took a lease of a farm there. Her brother, Geoffrey Whitney (c.1548–c.1601), is likewise believed to have been brought up there; also a poet, he is known for his collection Choice of Emblemes.
 William Baker (1705–71), architect, surveyor and building contractor, lived at Highfields from the 1740s.
 Field Marshal Stapleton Cotton, 1st Viscount Combermere (1773–1865), soldier, associate of the Duke of Wellington, was educated at a grammar school then in Audlem for three years from age nine before entering Westminster School.
 Henry Lisle (1846 in Audlem – 1916), lawyer and political figure in Saskatchewan, Canada
 Alice Elizabeth Gillington (1863 in Audlem – 1934), author, poet and journalist; published books about Gypsies
 Mary Clarissa Gillington, later better known as May Byron (1861 in Audlem – 1936), author, poet, elder sister of Alice Gillington
 Herbert Broomfield (1878 in Audlem – unknown), football goalkeeper, 28 pro appearances for Bolton Wanderers F.C.
 Peter Ellson (1925 in Audlem – 2014), professional footballing goalkeeper, 219 pro appearances for Crewe Alexandra F.C.
 Peter McGarr (born 1953), classical composer and teacher; he has written several pieces inspired by Audlem ('Audlem Sonatas', 'Night-time' and 'Mourning Gamelan'), as homage to his mother, who lived in the village when she was a child.
 Margaret Canovan (1939–2018), political theorist, lived in Audlem from 1979 to 2003 while working at Keele University.

See also

 Listed buildings in Audlem
 St. James' Church, Audlem
 Audlem Baptist Church

Notes and references

Notes

Bibliography

External links

 Audlem Online
 Audlem Special Events Team
 

Civil parishes in Cheshire
Villages in Cheshire